Ocloyas (Jujuy) is a rural municipality and village in Jujuy Province in Argentina.

Location  
47 km from the city of San Salvador de Jujuy by RP 35.

References

Populated places in Jujuy Province